This is an incomplete bibliography of  Scientology and Scientology-related books produced within the Church of Scientology and its related organizations, containing all of the Basic Books and some other later works either compiled from other works by or written directly by L. Ron Hubbard.

All entries are by L. Ron Hubbard or are "based on the Works of L. Ron Hubbard", unless otherwise noted.

Basic Books

The following are known as the Basic Books. These were written within the first years of Dianetics and Scientology development and are not compiled, but rather authored in their entirety by L. Ron Hubbard.

 Dianetics: The Original Thesis (1948)
 Originally circulated in manuscript form to a few friends, it was soon copied and passed hand-to-hand. It later became widespread and generated a large inflow of correspondence filled with questions, prompting Hubbard to write Dianetics: The Modern Science to Mental Health. Included in this book: The Primary Axioms of Dianetics—axioms upon which the entire subject is built; the discovery of the Dynamic Principle of Existence that drives all life forms—SURVIVE!; the Four Dynamics by which life is compartmented and which determine one's survival; the discovery and anatomy of the Reactive Mind; engrams, the single source of all irrational behavior; the powerful command in every engram which prevented their discovery and handling before Dianetics; the Analytical Mind, its function and operation; the first description of the state of Clear; its attributes and potentials and the Laws of Returning—containing the explanation of both how and why auditing works.
 This book is the result of the first compilation of Hubbard's thoughts on his personal research aimed at discovering a technology of the human mind. James R. Lewis writes that the book "contained his basic conclusions concerning the nature of human aberrations and his early ideas about handling them through the counseling technique called auditing."
 Dianetics: The Modern Science of Mental Health (May 1950)
 Regarded as "Book One" by Scientologists, this book set forth Hubbard's principles about the "Reactive Mind" and the "dynamic principle of existence".
 Dianetics: The Evolution of a Science (April 1950)
 Reprints the original Astounding Science Fiction article from (May 1950) that introduced Dianetics prior to Book One. This book contains the only account of how the optimum computing machine—the mind—works, how Hubbard discovered Basic Personality, how the Dynamic Principle of Existence—SURVIVE!—was first isolated, how wrong answers enter into the mind and are held down (giving further wrong answers), how there seem to be "Demons" of the mind, how the engram was discovered, and how Dianetics techniques were developed.
 Science of Survival (June 1951)
 In this book, Hubbard introduced concepts that were later to become key elements of Scientology: theta, the tone scale, and the possibility of past lives. It contains a description of how theta interacts with the physical universe of matter, energy, space and time—termed MEST. The book is written around a Chart of Human Evaluation, providing a complete description of the tone scale and the components of emotion—the triangle of Affinity, Reality and Communication and how these components work together (ARC).
 Self Analysis (August 1951)
 Included in this book are the laws of survival and abundance, the most embracive description of consciousness, humanity's efforts for immortality and its relationship to matter, energy, space and time, Essays describing a broad array of discoveries including time, remembering, forgetting, imagination, valences and special auditing lists for each. This book also includes self-processing lists that provide the most powerful of auditing and which can be done anywhere and at any time.
 Advanced Procedure and Axioms (November 1951)
 This is a Dianetics book with theory later developed and has such basic subjects as the Dianetic Axioms—all of the axioms on which the theory of Dianetics is structured; the Dianetic Logics, a system of thought and analysis based on infinite-valued logic and through which any situation may be evaluated, which Hubbard used from that point on in his research. This book also introduces such concepts as "Self-Determinism", "Absolute Responsibility", and the "Service Facsimile"—a mechanism by which the individual seeks to make themselves right and others wrong by suffering from some inability, illness etc.
 Handbook For Preclears (December 1951)
 This Dianetics book shares much of the theory of Advanced Procedure and Axioms and is dedicated to self-processing.
 A History of Man (July 1952)
 Also known as History of Man, Scientology: A History of Man, and its original title What to Audit, this book Hubbard gives ample general case data and rudimentary instructions on how to audit the "Whole Track" (all of the incidents lived by the individual—known as the thetan) and certain common incidents found in all genetic entities (the theta entity apart from the individual himself, which has been found to play a key role in the evolution and development of the body). Among the genetic entity case stories are some of single-celled organisms, clams, sloths and neanderthals. On the thetan's whole track are incidents loosely called "space opera," including "implants," which are strong engrams deliberately inflicted on the victim for political purposes.
 One of Hubbard's first documented writings on the process of "theta clearing" was in the book, where Hubbard states, "Theta clearing is about as practical and simple as repairing a shoelace. It has nothing to do with hypnotism, voodooism, charlatanism, monkeyism or eosophy. Done, the thetan can do anything a stage magician can do in the way of moving objects around." (p.59) 
 Scientology 8-80 (November 1952)
 This book contains the basic laws by which the thetan is able to create energy and therefore influence the environment around him. It also therefore includes newly developed processing related to energy production and stuck or uncontrolled energy over which the thetan is not taking responsibility.
 Scientology 8-8008 (December 1952)
 This is one of the most important books in Scientology. The number 8-8008 is a symbolism for the reduction of the MEST universe to zero and expansion of one's own universe to infinity. This book deals in the subject of postulates, considerations and the way in which the individual perceives and therefore creates the physical universe and also his own universe. Processing here deals with the complete rehabilitation of one's own universe so that one can cause an effect on the shared physical universe. 
 The Creation of Human Ability (July 1954)
 This book contains all of the processes derived from previous data and the newly introduced objective processes—which deal in directly perceiving and affecting objective, present-time reality both with the person either interior or exterior to his body. Theologian Marco Frenschkowski comments that the book was created as a reference guide for auditors, to address the practical necessity of orienting them to a "more technical, less philosophical side of Scientology." It was compiled by Hubbard's office and starts with a bible quotation from the gospel of Luke, one of the longest biblical quotations in the founder's writings. The quotation considers Scientology as similar to early Christian missions, because of the common sense of urgency and experience of being in a mission.
 Dianetics 55! (December 1954)
 This book deals with a very large range of processes all centering around the subject of the individual's communications with his environment. It is the 1955 answer to Dianetics: The Modern Science of Mental Health.
 Scientology: The Fundamentals of Thought (1956)
 This book contains all basic Dianetics and Scientology principles and processes developed to the individual and their life as a game. A basic concept in the book is that life is a game no matter what, and that the basic variable is the degree to which the individual knows what games they are playing and the degree to which they can knowingly come up with new ones.

Additional books on Scientology
These books are not part of the Basics and are either written directly by or compiled from other works by L. Ron Hubbard.
 Excalibur (1938) (Unpublished)
 How to Live though an Executive (1953)
 Brain-Washing Manual (1955, Black Propaganda)
 Problems of Work (October 1956)
 All About Radiation (1957)Written by Hubbard, Gene Denk, and Farley R. Spink. Some editions list Hubbard as sole author. Some editions fallaciously refer to Hubbard as a nuclear physicist on the cover.
 Have You Lived Before This Life (1958) (No longer published)A collection of "forty-one actual case histories" of reincarnation and past-life experiences, gleaned from auditing with an e-meter at the Church of Scientology's "Fifth London Advanced Clinical Course" held in October–November 1958.
 The Book of E-Meter Drills (1965)Written by Mary Sue Hubbard; post-1988 editions were credited to L. Ron Hubbard.
 Introduction to Scientology Ethics (1968)Written by Hubbard.
 Scientology: A New Slant on Life (1976)Compiled from works by Hubbard, it contains such Scientology articles as "Is It Possible to Be Happy?", "Two Rules for Happy Living", "Personal Integrity", and "'The Anti-Social Personality." "A New Slant On Life is a highly practical handbook for the reader seeking to understand himself or herself, and discover his or her own answers."
 The Way to Happiness (1981)In this book, Hubbard wrote a set of relatively loose, common-sense guidelines to achieving happiness.

Books published after Hubbard's death in 1986

 Clear Body, Clear Mind (1990)Also known as Purification. Compiled from earlier Hubbard bulletins. Related to the effect harmful chemicals, particularly those lodged in the fatty tissues of the body have in the mind and how these can be removed to solve the problem.
 Art (1991)Art was originally a technical bulletin on the theory of art, Hubbard's attempt at codification of an aesthetic theory. Hubbard's approach focuses on the overlap between communication and art. The three axioms of art that he proposed in the book was that first, "too much originality throws the audience into unfamiliarity and therefore disagreement". Second that "technique should not rise above the level of workability for the purpose of communication". Third, "perfection cannot be attained at the expense of communication". 
 The Scientology Handbook (1994)The Scientology Handbook'' is an 871-page handbook published by the Church of Scientology. Although Hubbard is listed as the sole author, it is described as having been "compiled by the LRH Book Compilation Staff of the Church of Scientology International".

See also
 L. Ron Hubbard bibliography
 Scientology filmography
 Written works of L. Ron Hubbard

References

External links
 Scientology.org: Materials & Services: Books
 Lronhubbard.org: Scientology Books and Materials
 Scientology Bibliography

Religious bibliographies
Books about Scientology
Works by L. Ron Hubbard